Peter Michael Rosenthal (born June 1, 1941) is Canadian-American Professor Emeritus of Mathematics at the University of Toronto, an adjunct professor of Law at the University of Toronto, and a lawyer in private practice.

Early life  
Rosenthal grew up in Queens, New York with his parents and two brothers.

Mathematics career 
Rosenthal graduated from Queens College, City University of New York with a B.S. in Mathematics in 1962. In 1963 he obtained an MA in Mathematics and in 1967 a Ph.D. in Mathematics from the University of Michigan; his Ph.D. thesis advisor was Paul Halmos. His thesis, "On lattices of invariant subspaces" concerns operators on Hilbert space, and most of his subsequent research has been in operator theory and related fields. Much of his work has been related to the invariant subspace problem, the still-unsolved problem of the existence of invariant subspaces for bounded linear operators on Hilbert space. Among many other topics, he has made substantial contributions to the development of reflexive and reductive operator algebras and to the study of lattices of invariant subspaces, composition operators on the Hardy-Hilbert space and linear operator equations.  His publications include many with his long-time collaborator Heydar Radjavi, including the book "Invariant subspaces" (Springer-Verlag, 1973; second edition 2003).

Rosenthal has supervised the Ph.D. theses of fifteen students and the research work of a number of post-doctoral fellows.

Legal career 
In parallel with his career in mathematics, Rosenthal has pursued a career in law.  He worked as a paralegal before obtaining an LL.B. from the University of Toronto in 1990.  He was called to the Ontario Bar in 1992.  He is a major figure in the Toronto legal community, and has been profiled by Toronto Life, The Globe and Mail,  and the Toronto Star  In 2006, Now Magazine named Rosenthal Toronto's "Best activist lawyer". In May 2016, he was awarded a Law Society Medal by the Law Society of Upper Canada.

Rosenthal represented Miguel Figueroa, the leader of the Communist Party of Canada, in the case Figueroa v. Canada before the Supreme Court of Canada.  The court ruled in Figueroa's favor, striking down a law that prohibited small political parties from obtaining the same tax benefits as large parties.

He has represented hundreds of activists who faced charges as a result of political protests, including Shawn Brant, John Clarke (activist),  Vicki Monague of Stop Dump Site 41 , Dudley Laws and Jaggi Singh, and has written articles about some of those cases.

Works 
 , 2nd edition 
 
 
 (with Sheldon Axler and Donald Sarason) editors. A Glimpse at Hilbert Space Operators, Birkhäuser, 2010.

References 

1941 births
Living people
University of Michigan alumni
University of Toronto alumni
Academic staff of the University of Toronto
Academic staff of the University of Toronto Faculty of Law
Canadian mathematicians
20th-century Canadian mathematicians
Queens College, City University of New York alumni
Canadian lawyers
Operator theorists
Algebraists
People from Queens, New York